The Chimes is a short 1844 novel by Charles Dickens.

The Chimes may also refer to:

 The Chimes (Scottish band)
 The Chimes (US band)
 The Chimes, Uxbridge, a shopping centre in England
 The Chimes (album), a 1990 album by the Scottish band The Chimes
 The Chimes (film), a 1914 British silent drama film

See also
 Chime (disambiguation) for various musical instruments by this or similar names
 "The Chimes of Big Ben", the second episode of the British science fiction series The Prisoner
 The Chimes of Midnight, a 2002 audio drama based on the television series Doctor Who
 The Chimes of Normandy, the operetta Les cloches de Corneville
 The Chymes, a 1960s garage rock group from California